A spiral (sometimes called a spiral loop or just loop) is a technique employed by railways to ascend steep hills.

A railway spiral rises on a steady curve until it has completed a loop, passing over itself as it gains height, allowing the railway to gain vertical elevation in a relatively short horizontal distance. It is an alternative to a zig-zag, and avoids the need for the trains to stop and reverse direction while ascending. If the train is longer than the length of each loop it may be possible to view it looping above itself.

The term "loop" is also often used for a railway that curves sharply and goes back on itself: if the railway crosses itself, then it forms a spiral or helix; otherwise, it forms the much more common horseshoe curve or bend.

List of spirals

Argentina

Australia
 Spiral on the uphill track at Bethungra  on the Main Southern railway line in New South Wales. The downhill track remains on the original steep plain 1 in 40 gradient.
 Spiral on the single track at Cougal  on the North Coast railway line, New South Wales.

Bulgaria

Canada
 There used to be a spiral at Rogers Pass at  that was superseded when the Connaught Tunnel (British Columbia) was built.

China
 Six spirals on the Chengdu–Kunming Railway at:
 Three spirals on the Liupanshui–Hongguo Railway at: 
This line was rebuilt on a shorter route in 2014.

(see photo).

Costa Rica

Croatia

Eritrea
This spiral pushes the definition of a spiral as the line crosses itself but then immediately crosses back, and it does this in a tunnel.

France
 Three spirals on the Col de Tende line between Ventimiglia to Cuneo as it passes through France, a further spiral on this line is in Italy.
This spiral is now a footpath.

Germany
The line was built partly for strategic reasons and had to be built to a reasonable gradient in order to haul heavy military trains over it. The alternative, shorter Singen–Waldshut route was not available for this traffic, since it crossed Swiss territory. The line is now a heritage railway.

India

 There are currently three spirals on the Darjeeling Himalayan Railway:
The Darjeeling Himalayan Railway originally had five or six spirals but only five in operation at any one time. The line also has six reverses or zig-zags. 

Iran

Ireland
 The St. James's Gate Brewery, Dublin, Ireland formerly had an internal  gauge railway with a loop in a tunnel to gain height between buildings.

Italy
 Spiral at Bortigiadas  on the Sassari-Palau railway on Sardinia.
 Spiral near Lanusei  on the Mandas–Gairo–Arbatax railway on Sardinia.
 Varzo Spiral Tunnel near Iselle di Trasquera  on the Swiss Federal Railways just south of the Southern Portal of the Simplon Tunnel.
 Spiral near Vernante  on the Col de Tende railway from Ventimiglia to Cuneo. There are a further three spirals on this line in French territory.
Vanvitelli and Quattro Giornale stations are on the loop itself.
 Spiral at Casole Bruzio  on the Cosenza to San Giovanni in Fiore line (line exists but is not in service).

Japan

Okoba Station is situated on a zig zag part way around the loop.

Kenya

There are three spirals on the  gauge railway line from Kenya to Uganda. This railway has been superseded by the Mombasa–Nairobi Standard Gauge Railway, which has removed the need for spirals by constructing tunnels and bridges.

 Spiral South of Mazeras at  near Mombasa.
 Spiral near Makutano station at : .

South Korea

There is one loop on a single track railway but double track is installed in the middle of the tunnel to enable trains from opposing directions to pass each other.
A new double track tunnel has opened which by-passes the line with the spiral, which has since closed.
A new double track tunnel has opened which by-passes the line with the spiral, which has since closed.

Madagascar

Mexico

Myanmar

New Zealand
The line is single track and involves two short tunnels around a suitable hill.
This railway also has several reverses or zig-zags.

Norway

Peru

Russia
 There used to be a spiral at "Devil's Bridge",  on the now abandoned line from Kholmsk to Yushno-Sakhalinsk on Sakhalin Island.

Serbia

Slovakia
The spiral is constructed of two viaducts and a 1,200m tunnel.

South Africa

Spain

Sri Lanka
Demodara railway station is located above the spiral tunnel.

Switzerland

 The Gotthard railway has spirals and  horseshoe curves or bends mostly in tunnels on its standard gauge, double track line. The spirals are:
 RhB Albulabahn has four spirals, mainly in tunnels, on its metre gauge single track. The spirals are at:
 It could also be argued that the horseshoe curves immediately South of Bergün at  also form a spiral as it appears that one curve overlaps the other.
This is a fine example of an open spiral mainly on the Brusio spiral viaduct on a metre gauge single track railway.
This is a single track partial rack railway with the catenary equipment removed.

Taiwan

Uganda
 There used to be a spiral at Circle Hill  on the Western Uganda Extension of the Kenya to Uganda Railway Line to Kasese.

United Kingdom

Not all parts are used by passenger trains.

United States

The spiral was completed in 1884, abandoned and dismantled in 1939, rebuilt between 1972 and 1984 and is now owned by History Colorado and operated as the Georgetown Loop Railroad.
Track relocation in 1951 removed all of this but added a new horseshoe at milepost 48. 
The spiral was bypassed by the Moffat Tunnel built in 1928, and was dismantled in 1935.
It was bypassed in 1940 and the branch removed in 1943.
The spiral was completed in 1963. The spiral was bypassed by two switchbacks after a trestle fire in 1976.

See also
 Spiral bridge - road equivalent
 Hairpin turn
 List of spiral tunnels and tunnels on a curved alignment
 List of steepest gradients on adhesion railways
 Zig Zag Railways

References

External links

 Helixes, Tunnels, Spirals, and Other Unique Trackage

Railway track layouts
Spirals